Ozarovsky (masculine) or Ozarovskaya (feminine) is a Russian last name, a variant of Azarov. Despite sounding similar to the Russian word "" (ozareniye, meaning enlightenment), this last name is unrelated to it.

People with the last name
Olga Ozarovskaya, Russian folklore performer whose works were illustrated by Leonid Khizhinsky

References

Notes

Sources
Ю. А. Федосюк (Yu. A. Fedosyuk). "Русские фамилии: популярный этимологический словарь" (Russian Last Names: a Popular Etymological Dictionary). Москва, 2006. 

Russian-language surnames
